A Pontifical Legate is a personal representative of the Pope.

Specifically, this title is used for:
 the formal title of the Cardinal or (Arch)bishop appointed to represent the Holy See in the administration of one or more Papal minor basilica(s), notably:
 the Pontifical Legation for the Basilicas of Saint Francis and Saint Mary of the Angels in Assisi (or until 2006, its precursor only for the Basilica of Saint Francis of Assisi)  
 a generic synonym for any (usually diplomatic) papal legate

See also 
 Pontifical Delegate
 Legate (disambiguation)

References

Catholic ecclesiastical titles